Sithu U Tin (1890–1972) was a prominent Burmese architect and engineer, best known for designing the Yangon City Hall, the Yangon Central Railway Station and Basic Education High School No. 2 Dagon (formerly Myoma High School). He was known for his syncretic architectural style, by fusing indigenous elements, such as tiered roofs called pyatthat with Western designs.

References

Burmese engineers
1890 births
1972 deaths
20th-century engineers